NRK2 (NRK To) is one of the TV channels of the Norwegian Broadcasting Corporation (NRK). It was launched on 1 September 1996.

History 
The channel started its regular broadcasts on 1 September 1996, but the evening before, a live simulcast, led by Trond-Viggo Torgersen, was broadcast on both NRK1 and NRK2. Sunday 1 September was the first regular broadcast day, and around 880,000 people watched the channel during the first evening. From the start, the channel was to be youth-oriented and had people between the ages of 15 and 35 as its main target group. For the first eleven years, before the channel changed its profile, culture, entertainment and music programs were mainly broadcast. The channel was officially called "NRK TO" from the start until 4 September 2000.

NRK2 was originally supposed to act both as an overflow channel for NRK1, and as a youth channel. In the evening, many films and series were previously broadcast, in addition to programs that had been broadcast on NRK1. During the day, the schedule usually consisted of interactive entertainment, such as chatting. In 2003, Svisj began, which has been broadcast outside the regular program at night and during the day. It mainly consisted of chat and music videos that viewers could vote on using text messages. Sometimes, instead of music videos, other types of footage could be selected - such as sports or Autofil features.

Despite the fact that over 800,000 viewers watched the channel on the first broadcast day in 1996, the viewing figures were rather weak in the first week. The newscasts fared best with a peak of 156,000 viewers. In comparison, TV2's Nyhetene had 567,000 viewers and Dagsrevyen 769,000 viewers on the same day. Eva Bratholm's Bokbadet came all the way down in 46th place with only 22,000 viewers. Autumn 1996 was disappointing for NRK2, with viewership rarely exceeding 100,000 viewers. In the winter of 1997, however, things began to turn around, and during March the channel surpassed TV3 and was about equal with TVNorge with a viewership of around 200,000 on the most watched programs such as Norge i dag and Absolutt.

With the creation of NRK3, NRK2 was changed on 3 September 2007 to a factual and current affairs channel, with an emphasis on news, documentaries and other factual material as well as some cultural material. Among other things, Dagsrevyen was simulcast between NRK1 and NRK2 in the autumn of 2007. Kulturnytt was moved from NRK1 to NRK2, at the same time as the programme's broadcasting time was extended.

After well over a year, NRK moved away from the concept that NRK2 should function as its news channel. In the period when continuous news broadcasts were originally broadcast, repeats of NRK's district news were broadcast instead.

On 1 February 2011, the HD feed of the channel (NRK2 HD) was launched.

The channel had a market share of 5.3 percent in 2016.

From 1 January 2018, Nyheter has the right of way on NRK2 to give sister channel NRK1 a more predictable schedule layout, following complaints from viewers that programs such as "Med hjartet på rette staden" were repeatedly interrupted due to extra news broadcasts on NRK1. As of January 2018, NRK2 wasn't programming between 6am and 6pm.

Programming 
NRK2 since its launch has traditionally concentrated on more on cultural and in-depth programmes than its sister channel NRK1 and has also shown drama series, comedies, and news. In 2003, it started to air "Svisj", an interactive programme with music videos and SMS chat. With the launch of NRK3 in early September 2007, "Svisj" moved to the new station and NRK2 refocused its programming to focus on news, documentaries, and cultural programs.

NRK2 offers news, factual and science programmes, in addition to drama, music programs and entertainment. The program profile for 2018 was divided among the following themes:
 News (26%)
 Facts and society (19%)
 Nature and science (13%)
 Leisure/Hobby/Lifestyle (9%)
 Drama (9%)
 Music (8%)
 Entertainment (7%)
 Sports (6%)
 Other (4%)

Logos and identities

References

External links 
 NRK TV overview, all television channels (NRK, official website) 
 NRK2 Live TV on internet 
 NRK TV history  
 Program overview for Norwegian television channels 
 About NRK 

NRK
Television channels in Norway
Television channels and stations established in 1996
1996 establishments in Norway